Jonathan Robert Aibel (born August 6, 1969 in Demarest, New Jersey) and Glenn Todd Berger (born August 26, 1969 in Smithtown, New York) are American screenwriters and producers, who are best known for writing the Kung Fu Panda movies, The SpongeBob Movie: Sponge Out of Water, Trolls, and its sequel Trolls World Tour.

Filmography

References

External links

American male screenwriters
Screenwriting duos
1969 births
DreamWorks Animation people
Nickelodeon Animation Studio people
Skydance Media people
Annie Award winners
Living people